The Legislative Research Commission (LRC) is an agency of Kentucky state government that supports the state legislature, the Kentucky General Assembly.

The LRC was originally created in 1948 with the Lieutenant Governor of Kentucky as its head.

The LRC is composed of 16 legislators, drawn from the leadership of the Kentucky House of Representatives and the Kentucky Senate.  The President of the Kentucky Senate and the Speaker of the Kentucky House of Representatives serve as co-chairs.

The Kentucky General Assembly may only meet for 60 days in even numbered years and for 30 days in odd numbered years, so in between those sessions interim committees meet under the auspices of the LRC. The LRC also provides the General Assembly with staff and research support including committee staffing, bill drafting, oversight of the state budget and educational reform, production of educational materials, maintenance of a reference library and Internet site, and the preparation and printing of research reports, informational bulletins and a legislative newspaper. The agency is run on a day-to-day basis by a Director.

References

External links
 Legislative Research Commission

Kentucky General Assembly
State agencies of Kentucky